Pressure of speech or pressured speech is a tendency to speak rapidly and frenziedly. Pressured speech is motivated by an urgency that may not be apparent to the listener. The speech produced is difficult to interpret. 

Such speech may be too fast, erratic, irrelevant, or too tangential for the listener to understand. It is an example of cluttered speech, and is often associated with certain mental disorders, particularly mania and schizophrenia. It can be unrelenting, loud, and without pauses.

Description
Pressured speech is unrelenting, rapid, often loud talking without pauses. Those with pressured speech do not respond to verbal and nonverbal cues indicating that others wish to speak, turning from one listener to another or speaking even when no listeners remain. They are unable to listen to others, either talking nonstop until they run out of energy, or just standing there and looking at the other speaker before moving away. The speech can be either intelligible or unintelligible, and it is a hallmark symptom of a manic episode.

Causes 
The pace of the speech indicates an underlying thought disorder known as "flight of ideas" wherein the flow of ideas and information through one's mind is so fast that it is difficult to follow their train of thought. This is also tied to an inability to focus on one topic or task.

People with schizophrenia, as well as anyone experiencing extreme anxiety, may also exhibit pressure of speech.  Pressure of speech usually refers to the improperly verbalized speech which is a feature of hypomanic and manic illness.

Pressure of speech has commonly been observed in people diagnosed with attention deficit hyperactivity disorder.

Stimulants 
Psychostimulants such as cocaine or amphetamines may cause speech resembling pressured speech in individuals with pre-existing psychopathology and produce hypomanic or manic symptoms in general, owing both to the substance's own qualities and the underlying nature of an individual's psyche. In many psychotic disorders, use of certain drugs amplifies certain expressions of symptoms, and stimulant-induced pressured speech is among them.

Related conditions 
 Cluttering is a speech disorder that is related to pressure of speech in that the speech of a clutterer sounds improperly verbalized. However, cluttering is a distinct language disorder. Even though cluttering sounds almost identical to pressure of speech, it differs in that pressure of speech is rooted in anxiety, where cluttering is not.
 Pressure of speech is an instance of tachylalia, or rapid speech.  Pressure of speech is also variously related to agitolalia, agitophasia, tachyphasia, and verbomania.
 Circumstantial speech is a communication disorder in which the focus of a conversation drifts. In circumstantiality, unnecessary details and irrelevant remarks cause a delay in getting to the point.

Stutter formation 
Pressured speech may also lead to the development of a stutter. The person's need or pressure to speak causes them to involuntarily stutter. Therefore, the person's need to express themselves is greater than their ability to vocalise their thoughts.

See also
 Aphasia
 Auditory processing disorder
 Logorrhea

References

External links 

Bipolar disorder
Communication disorders
Symptoms and signs: Speech and voice